The Professorship of Divinity and Biblical Criticism at the University of Glasgow was founded in 1861. The patron was formerly the Crown (i.e. a Regius Professorship).  Since 1935, the University Court, acting on the recommendation of a Board of Nomination consisting of representatives of the University Court and of the General Assembly of the Church of Scotland, appoints the Professor.

(Regius) Professors of Divinity and Biblical Criticism
 William Purdie Dickson MA LLD DD (1863)
 William Stuart MA LLD DD (1873)
 George Milligan MA DCL DD (1910)
 George Hogarth Carnaby MacGregor MA DLitt DD (1933)
 William Barclay CBE MA BD DD (1963)
 Ernest Best MA BD PhD DD (1974-1982)
 John Riches MA (1991)

See also
List of Professorships at the University of Glasgow

Divinity and Biblical Criticism
Divinity and Biblical Criticism, *, Glasgow
1861 establishments in Scotland
Biblical criticism
1861 in education